Valvasone Arzene is a comune (municipality) in the Province of Pordenone in the Italian region Friuli-Venezia Giulia, located about  northwest of Trieste and about  east of Pordenone. It was formed on 1 January 2015 after the merger of the previous comuni of Valvasone and Arzene.

Valvasone is listed in the most beautiful villages in Italy.

History
The early history of the castle of Valvasone tells how in 1218 CE the original manor-house was kept by Ulvino and Bonfante for the Patriarch of Aquileia. These were the founders of the first feudal family, but in 1268 this family was killed during the rebellion of Corrado from Valvasone. The side of the Tagliamento River, which flows near the town, was too strategically important to leave it without any form of control, so the Patriarch assigned Walterpertoldo from Spilimbergo to control the area. In 1273 he did a great restoration to the buildings near the river, in order to effect the best form of control against invasion. These works, however, did not modify the structure of the town, that has the castle in its centre and the other buildings are situated around it. When Walterpertoldo died, and the first generation of the Spilimbergo ended, a contest for the succession in controlling Valvasone began between two really important families in the area: the Zuccola and the Cucagna. In 1292 the Patriarch Raimondo della Torre gave to Simone di Cucagna the power to control Valvasone and its surroundings, beginning the second genealogy of feudal overlords of Valvasone.

In that period Valvasone had a militar structure, but it was also the residence of those nobles who built the real village, the precursor of the modern town. Before 1300 the nobles decided to build up a surrounding stone wall; this was possible because they parcelled out the urban pieces of land and then gave these pieces to the craftsmen and shopkeepers. In front of the drawbridge the public loggia was built. Meanwhile a well was dug by the Torre delle Ore. Now these interventions are difficult to find because of more recent constructions. In the 1350s the nobles decided to enlarge the village: in this way they create one of the most beautiful examples of medieval town-planning in west Friuli. In the north area they built a small church, devoted to San Giacomo and outside of the walls a small village was created, with its own church, dedicated to S. Giovanni and S. Maria.

For about a decade the look of the town remained basically the same, but after the fall of the Patriarch and the arrive of the Venetians, the structure of Valvasone wasn't adequate to sustain the increasing commerce and traffic along the way Portogruaro-Venzone. So Giacomo Giorgio from Valvasone wanted to expand the village but also to restore the old buildings and the churches. He was responsible for the construction of the dom (1449) in the middle of the intern village. Because of that the two others churches were abandoned. The new division of land into smaller pieces was more residential than the previous two and in this division was built a new small church, devoted to Ss. Pietro and Paolo, saints loved by the population. In the end the hospital, which operated since 1335, was restored.

In 1511 the population attacked the castle, which however was empty, and it was set to fire. In the late 19th century, as in a lot of towns in Friuli, the walls were destroyed, but the medieval atmosphere is still untouched.

Events
Zir dai Arboras: during the night of 5 January, a great number of Epiphany fires are lighted, and by every fire there is a combination of music, warm spicy wine and cakes.
Wild marjoran concerts: during spring time a list of concerts are organized in the dom, where it is possible to listen to the only venetian wild  in Friuli.
San Pietro and Paolo celebration: during June the towns honors the two patrons.
Historical evocation: the second week end of September.

People
Tullio Avoledo
Antonio Montico

References

External links
 Official website

Cities and towns in Friuli-Venezia Giulia